The Constitution of the Republic of Abkhazia was adopted by the Supreme Council of the Republic of Abkhazia of the 12th convocation on 26 November 1994, and by the national referendum on 3 October 1999, with an amendment adopted by the national referendum on the same day. On the 15th anniversary of its adoption, a special meeting was held between the current convocation of the People's Assembly and many of the members who were present in 1994. Sergei Shamba reported that he had written down the exact time of adoption as 17:14.

Structure

The constitution consists of seven chapters.

Principles of the Constitutional System 
Human Rights and Freedoms of a Citizen
Legislative Power
Executive Power
Judicial Power
Local Government  
Constitutional Amendments and Revision Procedure

References

External links
Text of the Constitution
English text of the Constitution

Abkhazia
Law of Abkhazia
1994 in law
1999 in law
National symbols of Abkhazia